Pyotr Vadimovich Zakharov (born 27 July 1979) is a Russian professional bandy player. He has been playing for the Volga Ulyanovsk since 2015 and has been part of the Russia national bandy team in many world championship competitions.

References

External links
 
 

1979 births
Living people
Russian bandy players
Volga Ulyanovsk players
Russian Bandy Super League players
Bandy World Championship-winning players